Ray Criswell (born August 16, 1963) is a former American football punter. He played for the Tampa Bay Buccaneers from 1987 to 1988.

References

1963 births
Living people
American football punters
Florida Gators football players
Tampa Bay Buccaneers players
Orlando Thunder players
National Football League replacement players